The women's 4 x 100 metres relay at the 2017 World Championships in Athletics was held at the London Olympic Stadium on 12 August.

Summary
USA with Aaliyah Brown and the home British team with Asha Philip were out fast, gaining slightly on Tatjana Pinto for Germany to their outside, while outside of Germany, Jura Levy had Jamaica pulling away. USA and Jamaica had smooth handoffs to Allyson Felix and Natasha Morrison respectively, but the British team had a hesitation on the handoff to Desirèe Henry, losing a slight amount of time. On the backstretch, Henry passed Germany's Lisa Mayer. Felix made a comfortable hand off to Morolake Akinosun slightly ahead of Jamaica's handoff to Simone Facey, GBR handing off to Dina Asher-Smith two steps later. Through the final turn, Germany's Gina Lückenkemper made up a lot of ground as the field tightened. At the final handoff Jamaica's Sashalee Forbes took a quick glance back, USA's Tori Bowie took a more serious look to make sure she got the baton, effectively in  handoff style, while Germany to Rebekka Haase and the British to Daryll Neita used the more conventional blind handoffs to pull closer. Onto the straightaway, Bowie had a half metre lead over Forbes and Neita, who were virtually even. Neita looked to stay with Bowie for the first half of the straightaway, separating from Jamaica before Bowie put in some clear separation for the USA win. As Neita tightened, Forbes started to close but not enough for Jamaica to take the silver away from the British.

Records
Before the competition records were as follows:

The following records were set at the competition:

Qualification criteria
The first eight placed teams at the 2017 IAAF World Relays and the host country qualify automatically for entry with remaining places being filled by teams with the fastest performances during the qualification period.

Schedule
The event schedule, in local time (UTC+1), is as follows:

Results

Heats

The first round took place on 12 August in two heats as follows:

The first three in each heat ( Q ) and the next two fastest ( q ) qualified for the final. The overall results were as follows:

Final
The final took place on 12 August at 20:05. The results were as follows (photo finish):

References

relay
Relays at the World Athletics Championships
Women's sport in London